CJSP-FM (92.7 FM, Windsor's Country 95.9 & 92.7) is a Canadian radio station, which broadcasts at 92.7 MHz in Leamington, Ontario. CJSP is owned and operated by Blackburn Radio. The station features a country format and simulcasts its morning show from sister station CJWF-FM in Windsor.

History

Country 92.7 CJSP/Max-FM (2008-2012)
The station was given approval by the Canadian Radio-television and Telecommunications Commission on July 9, 2007. On November 27, 2007, the station signed on and went
into testing mode. On March 3, 2008 at 9 a.m., CJSP ended their testing mode and officially launched as Country 92.7 CJSP and became a full-service FM station. The station featured Southwestern Ontario radio vet Cordell Green in mornings and Randy Reeves as its imaging voice.

At Midnight on January 4, 2011, "Country 92.7 CJSP" came to an end and was replaced with variety hits 92-7 Max-FM, a similar format to now defunct 93.1 Doug-FM in nearby Detroit. All personalities were dropped from the lineup, with the exception morning hosts Cordell Green and Laura Carney. The rest of the day remained automated.

Country 95.9 & 92.7 (2012-Present)
On July 31, 2012 at 5am, after a mass budget cut at Blackburn Radio, CJSP dropped its variety hits format and began simulcasting CJWF-FM in Windsor as Country 95.9 & 92.7. Station host Cordell Green remained with the station as Program Director and host of the morning show before moving to afternoons in 2019.

On-Air Lineup
The current lineup is as follows:

 Morning Show (5:30am-10am): Windsor's Country Mornings - Morgan Ryan
 Afternoon Drive (2pm-7pm): Cordell Green
 Program Director/Music Director: Cordell Green

References

External links
Windsor's Country 95.9 & 92.7
CJSP-FM information from michiguide.com
 

Jsp
Jsp
Leamington, Ontario
Jsp
Radio stations established in 2007
2007 establishments in Ontario